Deschampsia is a genus of plants in the grass family, commonly known as hair grass or tussock grass. The genus is widespread across many countries.

The genus is named for French physician and naturalist Louis Auguste Deschamps (1765–1842).

Deschampsia species are used as food plants by the larvae of some species of Lepidoptera, including antler moth, the clay, clouded-bordered brindle, common wainscot, dark arches, dusky brocade, shoulder-striped wainscot, smoky wainscot and wall.

Deschampsia sometimes grow in boggy acidic formations, an example of which is the Portlethen Moss, Scotland. 
Deschampsia antarctica is the world's most southern monocot, and one of only two flowering plants of Antarctica.

Some species, such as D. cespitosa and D. flexuosa, are grown as ornamental garden plants.

Species
 Deschampsia airiformis (Steud.) Benth. & Hook.f. ex B.D.Jacks. – Chile, Argentina
 Deschampsia angusta Stapf & C.E.Hubb. – Zaire, Kenya, Uganda
 Deschampsia antarctica E.Desv. – Chile, Argentina, Antarctica, Falkland Islands, South Georgia, Crozet Islands, Heard-McDonald Islands, Kerguelen Islands, South Sandwich Islands
 Deschampsia argentea Lowe – Azores, Madeira, Canary Islands
 Deschampsia atropurpurea (Wahlenb.) Scheele – northern Eurasia, North America, Chile, Argentina
 Deschampsia baicalensis Tzvelev – Irkutsk
 Deschampsia berteroniana (Kunth) F.Meigen – Chile, Argentina
 Deschampsia bottnica (Wahlenb.) Trin. – Kvarken Archipelago (part of Finland)
 Deschampsia cespitosa (L.) P.Beauv. – temperate, subarctic, and alpine regions in North America, Eurasia, Africa, Australia, various islands
 Deschampsia chapmanii Petrie – New Zealand incl Antipodes, Macquarie Islands
 Deschampsia christophersenii C.E.Hubb. – Tristan da Cunha
 Deschampsia cordillerarum Hauman – Chile, Argentina
 Deschampsia danthonioides (Trin.) Munro – Annual hairgrass – Alaska, Yukon, British Columbia, western USA, Mexico 
 Deschampsia elongata (Hook.) Munro – Chile, Argentina, United States including Alaska, Canada, Mexico
 Deschampsia flexuosa (L.) Trin – Eurasia, alpine areas in Africa; northern North America, southern South America, Falkland Islands
 Deschampsia foliosa Hack. – Azores
 Deschampsia gracillima Kirk New Zealand including Antipodes, Tasmania
 Deschampsia kingii (Hook.f.) É.Desv. – Chile, Argentina
 Deschampsia klossii Ridl. – Lesser Sunda Islands, New Guinea
 Deschampsia koelerioides Regel – Siberia, Central Asia, China, Mongolia, Afghanistan, Pakistan
 Deschampsia laxa Phil. – Chile, Argentina
 Deschampsia leskovii Tzvelev – northern European Russia
 Deschampsia liebmanniana (E.Fourn.) Hitchc. – Mexico
 Deschampsia ligulata (Stapf) Henrard –  Borneo
 Deschampsia looseriana Parodi – Chile
 Deschampsia maderensis (Hack. & Bornm.) Buschm. – Madeira
 Deschampsia media (Gouan) Roem. & Schult. – central and southern Europe, Morocco, Caucasus
 Deschampsia mejlandii C.E.Hubb. – Tristan da Cunha
 Deschampsia mendocina Parodi – Argentina
 †Deschampsia mexicana Scribn. – Mexico, apparently extinct
 Deschampsia mildbraedii Pilg. – Cameroon
 Deschampsia nubigena Hillebr. – Hawaii
 Deschampsia parvula (Hook.f.) É.Desv. – Chile, Argentina, Falkland Islands, Anvers Island
 Deschampsia patula (Phil.) Skottsb. – Chile, Argentina
 Deschampsia pusilla Petrie – New Zealand South Island
 Deschampsia robusta C.E.Hubb. – Tristan da Cunha
 Deschampsia setacea (Huds.) Hack. – northern and western Europe
 Deschampsia tenella Petrie – New Zealand 
 Deschampsia venustula Parodi – Chile, Argentina
 Deschampsia wacei C.E.Hubb.- Tristan da Cunha

Formerly included
Deschampsia formerly included many species now placed in other genera, such as Aira, Antinoria, Bromus, Calamagrostis, Centropodia, Colpodium, Dissanthelium, Holcus, Periballia, Peyritschia, Poa, Trisetum and Vahlodea.

References

 
Poaceae genera
Taxa named by Palisot de Beauvois